Lophocampa maculata, the Yellow-spotted tussock moth, mottled tiger or spotted halisidota, is a moth of the family Erebidae and the tribe Arctiini, the tiger moths. The species was first described by Thaddeus William Harris in 1841. It is found across Canada, the western parts of the United States, south in the Appalachians to South Carolina and Kentucky.

The wingspan is 35–45 mm. The moth flies from May to July; the larvae remain from July to September. There is one generation per year. The larvae go through five instars; the final instar is black at the ends, with a yellow or orange middle section, which in some populations has black spots.

The larvae feed on the leaves of poplar and willow, but also feed on alder, basswood, birch, maple and oak.

It is a tiger moth but is commonly referred to as a "tussock moth" for the tufts of hair on the caterpillar. According to Wiktionary, a tussock is a tuft or clump of green grass or similar verdure, forming a small hillock.

Subspecies
Lophocampa maculata maculata
Lophocampa maculata agassizii (Packard, 1864) (California, British Columbia)
Lophocampa maculata texana (Rothschild, 1909) (Texas)

References

External links

maculata
Moths of North America
Moths described in 1841